Baek Il-Joo (also Baek Il-Ju, ; born August 14, 1985 in Seoul) is a South Korean swimmer, who specializes in freestyle events. Baek qualified for the women's 200 m freestyle, as South Korea's oldest swimmer (aged 26), at the 2012 Summer Olympics in London, by eclipsing the FINA B-standard entry time of 2:01.24 at the Dong-A Swimming Tournament in Ulsan. She challenged four other swimmers on the first heat at the Olympics, including two-time Olympian Natthanan Junkrajang of Thailand. Baek raced to third place by 0.77 of a second behind Switzerland's Danielle Villars with a third-slowest time of 2:04.32. Baek failed to advance into the semifinals, as she placed thirty-third overall in the preliminary heats.

References

External links
NBC Olympics Profile

1985 births
Living people
Olympic swimmers of South Korea
Swimmers at the 2012 Summer Olympics
South Korean female freestyle swimmers
Swimmers from Seoul
21st-century South Korean women